"Half and half" is the name of various beverages and foods made of an equal-parts mixture of two substances, including dairy products, alcoholic beverages, and soft drinks.

Alcoholic beverages

Belgium 
In some cafés in Brussels, a "half en half", Dutch for "half and half", is a mixture of white wine and champagne. Originally, it was a mixture of two different typical beer types from Brussels: 50% lambic and 50% faro.

Denmark 
If you order a "half and half" in a Copenhagen bar, you will get a mixture of dark beer and pilsner (lager). The dark beer is a Danish version of an Imperial stout-type beer; in Denmark simply called "porter", which is a little sweeter than a Guinness.

Ireland, England and North America 

In Britain, a half and half may mean a mixture of mild ale and bitter.

In the North East of England, a request for a half and half would more commonly produce a combination of Scotch ale and India pale ale (IPA). This drink fell from favour when the Scottish & Newcastle brewery were obliged to sell many of their tied public houses and McEwan's Scotch and IPA disappeared from public bars across the North East.

In Canada and the United States, Black and Tan refers to Guinness and a lager or ale that will support the Guinness, most commonly Bass Ale, although some Irish-themed bars shun the term for its association with the Royal Irish Constabulary's "Black and Tans" force.   A Half and Half is Guinness and Harp. A Guinness and Smithwick's is a Blacksmith.

Scotland 

In Scotland, a "hauf an a hauf" (half and a half) is a glass of whisky (a "wee hauf", a quarter gill) and a half-pint of beer as a chaser.

Bosnia and Herzegovina, Croatia, Montenegro, Serbia, Macedonia 
"Pola pola" ("half and half") is a slang term for the drink spritzer, made out of equal parts of white wine or rosé wine and carbonated water. Different ratios of wine and carbonated water are named with various slang terms, depending on the region. "Pola pola" is also known as "litra i voda" (one bottle of wine and one bottle of carbonated water), as well as "Litar-litar" (as in 1 liter of wine, 1 liter of water) and "Gemišt".

Switzerland 
In Switzerland, and more particularly in Valais, a half & half is a mixture of dry and sweet liquor of the same fruit. In the canton of Geneva, a "moitié-moitié" generally refers to a digestif containing one half Williamine liqueur and one half Williamine eau-de-vie. In the canton of Ticino, a mezz e mezz (literally half and half in the local Ticinese dialect) refers to a mixture of one half local Merlot wine and one half gazosa (a local lemon-flavoured carbonated soft drink).

Uruguay 
In Uruguay there's a beverage called "Medio y Medio" ("half and half") that consists of sweet sparkling wine and dry white wine in equal parts. "Medio y medio" comes in Red, Rosé and White varieties, the latter being the original and most popular. It is massively consumed during the holidays but it can be found in certain places throughout the year as well. The most common "Medio y Medio" is the one produced by Roldós, a local restaurant that claims having invented the mixture.

"Medio y medio" is also the name for another cocktail, made with White Vermouth and "Caña" (literally "cane"), a 35–50% alcoholic beverage distilled from sugar cane. This name, however, is used not in the majority of bars but only in the most traditional ones, probably due to the existence of Roldós' "Medio y Medio".

Non-alcoholic beverages 
The Arnold Palmer, also known as a half and half, is popular in the Northeastern United States.  The drink consists of 1 part lemonade and 1 part iced tea; variations may include a mixture of sweet and unsweetened tea. In the Southern United States, "half and half" may also refer to a mixture of half sweet, half unsweetened tea.  Some coffee shops in colder climates serve a half and half drink consisting of half coffee and half hot chocolate, similar to caffè mocha. Half & Half might also refer to a flavor of soda that combines the flavors of grapefruit and lemon.

Canada and the United States 

In Canada and the United States, half and half almost always refers to a light cream typically used in coffee. (See below.) The name refers to the liquid's content of half milk and half cream. It is widely available in the United States, both in individual-serving containers and in bulk. It is also used to make ice cream. Non-fat versions of the product are also available, containing corn syrup and other ingredients.

Switzerland 
In the Romandy, a moitié-moitié (lit. half-half) can refer to coffee mixed with an equal amount of milk..

In the German-speaking part of Switzerland, especially in the north-eastern part, a mixture of apple and orange juice is known as "halb halb" ("half half", sometimes written 1+1).

Dairy product 

"Half and half" or "Half-and-half" is a mixture of milk and cream, which is often used in coffee and with breakfast cereals. In the United States, half and half is a common liquid product produced by dairy companies in premixed form. It was invented by William A. Boutwell of Boutwell Dairy in Lake Worth Beach, Florida, which distributed the blend regionally between 1927 and 1956.

In the United States, half-and-half must contain between 10.5 and 18 percent milkfat. It is pasteurized or ultra-pasteurized, and may be homogenized.

The following optional ingredients may also be used:
Emulsifiers
Stabilizers
Nutritive sweeteners
Characterizing flavoring ingredients (with or without coloring) as follows:
Fruit and fruit juice (including concentrated fruit and fruit juice).
Natural and artificial food flavoring.

Milkette 

The single cup of milk is stored in a sealed (foil cover) plastic cup of milk or cream with long shelf life but must be refrigerated.

Food

Netherlands
"Half-om-halfgehakt" (half for half minced meat) is commonly used for mixed minced meat, made of equal amounts of beef and pork. The term "Gehacktes halb und halb" is used in Germany, also referring to minced meat.

Switzerland
Moitié-moitié (lit. half-half) refers to a cheese fondue made with half Gruyère and half Vacherin Fribourgeois.

Sweden
In the Skaraborg region of Sweden "Hälta Hälta" ("Half Half" in the local dialect) refers to a serving of half french fries and half mashed potato, commonly served with sausage.

United States
A half-and-half pizza is one prepared with different toppings on each side of the pizza.

Wales
A half and half is commonly understood to be a side dish of half chips and half rice. A typical order might be "chicken curry half and half" or "chili con carne half and half".

See also 
 Black cow (disambiguation)

References

External links
 
 

Non-alcoholic mixed drinks
Cooking techniques
Dairy products
Alcoholic drinks